Dutch withdrawal from the European Union (colloquially "Nexit", a portmanteau of "Netherlands" and "exit") refers to the hypothesis that the Netherlands might withdraw from the European Union. The most recent opinion poll on the subject, in June 2020, showed a 3:1 majority against withdrawal.

Political initiatives
Dutch Prime Minister Mark Rutte called the possibility of a referendum "utterly irresponsible" and dangerous to the country. Political parties that are Hard Eurosceptic or calling for a referendum on European Union membership are the right-wing populist Party for Freedom and Forum for Democracy.

Public opinion

Polling
A poll in the Netherlands by the Pew Research Center in June 2016, conducted before the British referendum which led to the withdrawal of the UK from the EU, found 51% of the Dutch respondents to have a positive view of the European Union and 46% a negative view. Another poll by peil.nl in the aftermath of the 2016 British referendum found 50% of the respondents to be against a similar referendum in their country, with 46% of those in favour of remaining in the EU compared to 43% overall against remaining.

See also
 Euroscepticism

References

External links

Public policy proposals
Withdrawal from the European Union
Euroscepticism in the Netherlands